The P&O Hotel is a heritage listed building located at 25 High Street on the corner of Mouat Street in Fremantle, Western Australia. It was one of many commercial buildings constructed in Fremantle during the gold boom period in the late nineteenth and early twentieth century.

Description
The corner building is a two-storey Federation Filigree style structure. The highly decorative parapet has five large pediments featuring stilted arches with columns and decorative stucco along with balustrade and columns. The corner of the building parapet has the remains of a dome inscribed with the name The P&O Hotel in decorative stucco. The top of the dome has been removed. Both storeys feature large multi-paned windows with stucco architraves. The High Street and Mouat Street frontage features a bull nose veranda with extensive iron lacework and a truncated corner main entrance.

When it opened in 1901 the hotel's frontage along High Street took up half of the block to Henry Street, with a  frontage along Mouat Street. The building consisted of two bars, a large saloon, three private parlours, lavatories, a dressing room, dining rooms, and three shops on the ground floor. Upstairs there was another large saloon with two billiard tables, sitting rooms, bathroom and 21 bedrooms. The kitchens, sculleries and pantries were located at the rear of the building with the interior yard  containing stables and coach houses. The entire street frontage of the building was surrounded by wide verandahs. The building was completed at a cost of £8,000 by contractor Harry L. Roe under the instructions of the architects Cavanagh and Cavanagh.

History
The site was originally occupied by a much smaller establishment, the Victoria Hotel, which was built in the 1870s. In 1888 it was owned by Patrick Hagan, who was also the licensee. Hagan died in 1891 and left his entire estate, including both the P&O and the National Hotel, to his brother James. The brother sold both the Victoria and the National Hotel in 1893. Nicholas Gilbert became the licensee of the Victoria Hotel in 1895 and remained there until 1896. The Victoria Hotel was sold again in 1898 then rebuilt to the current exterior and renamed as the P&O Hotel. John Quigley was granted a licence for the hotel in the same year. The P&O Hotel was opened on 1 July 1901, and consisted of two bars, accommodation upstairs and stables at the rear. A number of shops and restaurants occupied the High Street frontage. A new publican's licence had been granted to W.A. Grenike in early June, prior to the hotel opening.

The hotel was taken over in 1902 by John Leslie. Leslie was charged with having sold adulterated liquor at the premises in 1905. He left in 1912 with E.H. Fielder taking over the same year. By 1913 Andrew Elliot was the new proprietor and in 1914 it was under new management again with Paul Reichards taking over.

By 1938 the hotel had a major interior renovation with two extra bars being added. The proprietor at this time was Clem Bahen, who spent £1,600 on alterations and renovations. Improvements included modern lighting and refrigeration being installed, leadlighting being added, new fittings and repainting. The contractor for the renovations was Frank Rennie and the plumbing contractor was A.H. Forster.

In the 1950s the impressive two-storey verandah was demolished and replaced with a box style awning. By 2000 the building was in poor condition and a 21-year lease was granted to the University of Notre Dame, who began a large scale renovation, with work being completed in early 2001. The building is being used for student accommodation; the first intake of foreign students arrived in 2001.

See also
List of heritage places in Fremantle

References

High Street, Fremantle
Heritage places in Fremantle
Hotels in Fremantle
1901 establishments in Australia
State Register of Heritage Places in the City of Fremantle